Puig de Fontlletera is a mountain of Catalonia, Spain. Located in the Pyrenees, it has an elevation of 2,577 metres above sea level.

See also
Mountains of Catalonia

References

Mountains of Catalonia
Mountains of the Pyrenees